Beverly is an unincorporated community in Elbert County, in the U.S. state of Georgia.

History
A post office called Beverly was established in 1897, and remained in operation until 1908. The community was named after Beverly Allen, the proprietor of a local tavern. An act of the Georgia General Assembly to incorporate Beverly in 1907 was repealed in 1919.

References

Unincorporated communities in Elbert County, Georgia
Unincorporated communities in Georgia (U.S. state)